Donkeshwar is a village in Nandipet Mandal in Nizamabad district in the Indian state of Telangana.

Demographics
As of 2011 India census, Donkeshwar had a population of 3732 in 961 households. Males constitute 47.85% of the population and females 52.15%. Donkeshwar has an average literacy rate of 60.21%, lower than the national average of 74%: male literacy is 57.7%, and female literacy is 42.2%. In Donkeshwar, 9.35% of the population is under 6 years of age.

References

Villages in Nizamabad district